Corrupt And Immoral Transmissions is the first EP by American alternative rock band Shivaree, released by Capitol Records in 2000. It features remastered version of live radio performances by the band and two unreleased studio recordings.

Track listing
 "Goodnight Moon (Live)" (Ambrosia Parsley, Duke McVinnie) – 4:14
 "I Don't Care (Live)" (Ambrosia Parsley, Duke McVinnie, Mia Sharp) – 4:26
 "Scrub" (Parsley, Duke McVinnie) – 5:50
 "My Boy Lollipop" (Johnny Roberts, Morris Levy, Robert Spencer) – 2:33

Personnel
Ambrosia Parsley – Vocals
Duke McVinnie – Guitar
Danny McGough – Keyboards
Sheldon Gomber - Bass
Andrew Borger - Drums
Smonkey Hormel - Bass

2000 debut EPs
Shivaree (band) albums
2000 live albums
Live EPs
Capitol Records EPs
Capitol Records live albums